Nacoleia rectistrialis is a moth in the family Crambidae. It was described by George Hampson in 1912. It is found on the Key Islands of Indonesia.

References

Moths described in 1912
Taxa named by George Hampson
Nacoleia
Moths of Indonesia